Brenda Lee is the second studio album by American singer Brenda Lee. The album was released August 1, 1960 on Decca Records and was produced by Owen Bradley. The album's second single "Sweet Nothin's" became Lee's first major hit single on the Billboard Hot 100, peaking within the Top 10. This was followed by the third single "I'm Sorry" released the following year that became her first single to top the Billboard Hot 100.

Background and content 
Brenda Lee was prepared in four separate sessions between 1958 and 1960 all at the Bradley Film and Recording Studio. The first session took place October 19, 1958, followed by a second session on August 13, 1959, which was then proceeded by a third session March 27, 1960. The final session took place one day later on March 28, 1960. Like her previous release, the album contained twelve tracks. Two tracks were stereo remakes of her earliest singles, her cover of Hank Williams's "Jambalaya", which was Lee's first single in 1956, and her 1957 single "Dynamite". The second track entitled "Weep No More Baby" was written by John D. Loudermilk and Marijohn Wilkin. The ninth track "That's All You Gotta Do" was written by country artist Jerry Reed, which was released as the B-side to Lee's 1960 single "I'm Sorry".

The album was originally released in the U.S. in monaural (Decca DL 4039) and stereo (Decca DL 74039) versions on an LP record, containing six songs on the first side of the record and six songs on the opposite end. The album has never been reissued on a compact disc in the United States, but it has been released in this format in Argentina and the United Kingdom.

Release 
The album's first single "Let's Jump the Broomstick" was released in April 1959. While it did not chart in the United States, the track did chart in the United Kingdom, peaking at #12 on the UK Singles Chart. "Sweet Nothin's" was released as the album's official second single in September 1959, becoming her first single to reach the Top 40 on the Billboard Hot 100, peaking at #4. In addition, the song also reached the same position on the UK Singles Chart. The third and final single released was "I'm Sorry", which became Lee's first song to reach #1 on the Billboard Hot 100, while also reaching #12 in the United Kingdom. "I'm Sorry's" B-side also gained significant radio airplay in 1960 and the song entitled "That's All You Gotta Do" peaked at #6 on the Billboard Hot 100. Both the songs "Sweet Nothin's" and "That's All You Gotta Do" also peaked within the Top 10 and 20 on the Billboard R&B music chart in 1960, reaching #12 and #19 respectively. Brenda Lee was officially released on August 1, 1960, peaking at #5 on the Billboard 200 albums chart, becoming one of three albums released to peak within the Top 10 on the Billboard 200 list.

Track listing 
Side one
"Dynamite" (Mort Garson, Tom Glazer) – 1:57
"Weep No More Baby" (John D. Loudermilk, Marijohn Wilkin) – 3:00
"Jambalaya (On the Bayou)" (Hank Williams) – 2:42
"(If I'm Dreaming) Just Let Me Dream" (Charles Singleton) – 2:49
"Be My Love Again" (Chuck Taylor) – 2:37
"My Baby Likes Western Guys" (Jackie Dee) – 2:13

Side two
"Sweet Nothin's" (Ronnie Self) – 2:24
"I'm Sorry" (Dub Allbritten, Self) – 2:40
"That's All You Gotta Do" (Jerry Reed) – 2:27
"Heading Home" – 2:40
"Wee Wee Willies" (Self) – 2:06
"Let's Jump the Broomstick" (Chas Robbins) – 2:25

Personnel 
 Harold Bradley – guitar
 Floyd Cramer – piano
 Dottie Dillard – background vocals
 Buddy Emmons – steel guitar
 Hank Garland – guitar
 Buddy Harman – drums
 Anita Kerr – background vocals
 Douglas Kirkham – background vocals, drums
 Millie Kirkham – background vocals
 Brenda Lee – lead vocals
 Grady Martin – guitar
 Bob Moore – bass
 Louis Nunley – background vocals
 Boots Randolph – saxophone
 Bill Wright – background vocals

Sales chart positions 
Album

Singles

References 

1960 albums
Brenda Lee albums
Albums produced by Owen Bradley
Decca Records albums